Claudia Hamilton Beamish (born 9 August 1952) is a Scottish Labour Co-operative politician who served as Member of the Scottish Parliament (MSP) for the South Scotland region from 2011 to 2021.

Early life
Claudia Hamilton Beamish is the daughter of the Conservative life peer Tufton Victor Hamilton Beamish, Baron Chelwood and his first wife Janet McMillan Stevenson. Prior to entering politics, she worked as a primary school teacher.

Political career
Beamish was placed at the top of Labour's list for the South of Scotland in the 2003 and 2007 Scottish Parliament elections and was Labour Co-operative candidate for Dumfriesshire, Clydesdale and Tweeddale at the 2010 general election.

Beamish was the Convener of the Equal Opportunities Committee in the Scottish Parliament in the second half of 2011. Following the election of Johann Lamont as Labour leader, Beamish was appointed as Labour's Shadow Minister for Environment and Climate Change. She served as a member of the Parliament's Rural Affairs, Climate Change and Environment (RACCE) Committee during its scrutiny of the Land Reform Bill 2015. She is a member of various Cross-Party Groups; Deputy Convenor of the Cross-Party Group on Dyslexia; Deputy Convenor of the Cross-Party Group on Men's Violence Against Women and Children; and Co-convenor of the Cross-Party Group on Carers.

Beamish nominated Anas Sarwar in the 2021 Scottish Labour leadership election.

She lost her seat in the 2021 Scottish Parliament election.

Personal life
Beamish's partner is actor Michael Derrington. They brought up their children in Pettinain, South Lanarkshire. While an MSP, she rented a flat in Shandon, Edinburgh which is owned by former Education minister Peter Peacock.

References

External links

1952 births
Living people
Daughters of life peers
Scottish schoolteachers
Labour Co-operative MSPs
Members of the Scottish Parliament 2011–2016
Members of the Scottish Parliament 2016–2021
Female members of the Scottish Parliament